The statues of Saints Norbert, Wenceslaus and Sigismund are outdoor sculptures installed on the north side of the Charles Bridge in Prague, Czech Republic. They were created by Josef Max.

External links

 

Christian sculptures
Monuments and memorials in Prague
Sculptures of men in Prague
Statues on the Charles Bridge
Wenceslaus I, Duke of Bohemia